Shin Bong-shik (born May 31, 1992 in Ansan) is a South Korean snowboarder, specializing in Alpine snowboarding.

Shin competed at the 2014 Winter Olympics for South Korea. He placed 26th in qualifying for the parallel giant slalom and 23rd parallel slalom, not advancing in either event.

As of September 2014, his best showing at the World Championships is 29th, in the 2011 parallel giant slalom.

Shin made his World Cup debut in October 2009. As of September 2014, his best finish is 10th, in a parallel slalom at Bad Gastein in 2013–14. His best overall finish is 34th, in 2013–14.

His sister Shin Da-hye is also a snowboarder.

Education
Korea University
Gunpo Suri High School

References

External links
 
 

1992 births
Living people
Olympic snowboarders of South Korea
Snowboarders at the 2014 Winter Olympics
People from Ansan
South Korean male snowboarders
Korea University alumni
Sportspeople from Gyeonggi Province
21st-century South Korean people